Jihlava is a city in the Czech Republic. It has about 50,000 inhabitants. Jihlava is the capital of the Vysočina Region, situated on the Jihlava River on the historical border between Moravia and Bohemia.

Historically, Jihlava is the oldest mining town in the Czech Republic, older than Kutná Hora. The historic centre of Jihlava is well preserved and is protected by law as an urban monument reservation.

Administrative division
Jihlava is made up of 17 administrative parts:

Jihlava
Horní Kosov
Staré Hory
Antonínův Důl
Červený Kříž
Helenín
Henčov
Heroltice
Hosov
Hruškové Dvory
Kosov
Pávov
Popice
Pístov
Sasov
Vysoká
Zborná

Etymology
The origin of the city's name (Iglau in German) is unclear. Most common theory has it derived from the German word Igel, meaning "hedgehog", usually in reference to the city's coat of arms. However, the name was in use since before the symbol of a hedgehog was. It is more likely the city is named for the river that flows through it, the name of which is also unclear in its origin, either being derived from the German word Igel as the first theory suggests, or from Slavic word jehla (i.e. "needle"), referring to sharp stones in the Jihlava river bed.

Geography

The city is situated on the historical border between Moravia and Bohemia, most of the city lies in Moravia.

Jihlava lies on the Jihlava River, at its confluence with the Jihlávka Stream. The municipal territory is rich on small fish ponds.

Jihlava is located in the heart of the Bohemian-Moravian Highlands. The northern part of the territory lies in the Upper Sázava Hills, the southern part lies in the Křižanov Highlands.

History

13th–14th centuries
Jihlava was originally a Slavic market village with a small Church of Saint John the Baptist, established on a trade route around 1200. The first written mention of Jihlava is from 1233. The mining of silver began here in 1234 and the royal mining town was established between 1233 and 1240. Jihlava thus became the oldest mining town in what is today the Czech Republic.

The village was originally located on the left bank of the river Jihlava, but with the expansion of mining and the influx of inhabitants, the town spread to the right bank, where its historic centre was established. The regular plan of the rectangular network of streets with a large square in the middle was given by the building regulations of King Ottokar II of Bohemia from 1270. Royal privileges guaranteed prosperity and Jihlava soon became one of the most powerful cities in the kingdom. It was protected by a massive fortification and coins were minted here. It became the first city in Central Europe where mining law was codified.

Mining attracted settlers from Bavaria, Saxony and other German-speaking regions to the city. Gradually a large German-speaking community was established here.

15th–19th centuries

At the end of the 14th century, the importance of mining declined when the richest deposits were mined, and Jihlava instead became a centre of trade and crafts, especially cloth making.

In the era of the Hussite Wars, Jihlava remained a Catholic stronghold and managed to resist a number of sieges. On 5 July 1436, a treaty was made with the Hussites here, whereby the Emperor Sigismund was acknowledged king of Bohemia. A marble relief near the city marks the spot where Ferdinand I, in 1527, swore fidelity to the Bohemian estates.

In 1523, a large fire severely damaged the city, which was subsequently restored in the Renaissance style. During the Thirty Years' War, Jihlava was twice captured by the Swedish troops. The suburbs were burned, most of the houses were demolished, and the city significantly depopulated. Jihlava recovered only after more than 100 years. The city was restored in the Baroque style and began to develop again.

In 1742, it fell into the hands of the Prussians, and in December 1805 the Bavarians under Karl Philipp von Wrede were defeated near the city.

In the second half of the 18th century, Jihlava was the second largest producer of cloth in the Austrian Empire. At that time the city expanded beyond the city walls. The city gates with narrow passages were demolished at the beginning of the 19th century, and the façades of the houses were remodeled in the Neoclassical style.

20th century
From an ethnic point of view, the city was about 80% German (census 1910: 21.756 out of 27.927 inhabitants). The city and its surroundings constituted a German-speaking enclave within Czech-speaking Bohemia and Moravia, so-called Jihlava Language Island. After World War I and the establishment of Czechoslovakia, the Germans demanded the annexation of the German language island to Austria. The Austrian demanded the language island for Austria, but the winners of the war gave all the german speaking territories of Bohemia and Moravia to the CSR. In the 1920 election, German parties won a majority.

The relatively peaceful coexistence of the Czech and German-speaking inhabitants that lasted for hundreds of years ended in 1918. Then the czech nationalism discriminated the german population, since 1933 the Sudeten German Party of Konrad Henlein raised.

The Jewish synagogue from 1862–1863 was burnt down in 1939. Most of Jihlava's Jewish population, which numbered over 1,000 people, was deported and killed due to the Holocaust in Bohemia and Moravia. After the end of World War II, starting from 9 May 1945, German-speakers were banned from using public transportation and were ordered to carry white armbands identifying them as Germans. Following the Beneš decrees, most of the German-speakers were expelled.

Between 1950 and 1952, Jihlava was the site of several show trials of Communist Party of Czechoslovakia, which were directed against the influence of the Roman Catholic Church on the rural population. In the processes eleven death sentences were passed. All the convicted persons were rehabilitated after the Velvet Revolution.

In 1969, in protest against the normalization in Czechoslovakia, Evžen Plocek set himself on fire on the city square in emulation of others in Prague. Today there is a memorial plaque to him.

Demographics

Economy
The industry in Jihlava is mainly focused on the production of machines and components for the automotive industry. The largest company based in the city is Bosch Diesel, a subsidiary of Robert Bosch GmbH. The company employs about 4,000 people and is among the largest employers in the region. It manufactures components for diesel injection pump.

Other important industrial companies include Marelli Automotive Lighting Jihlava (a producer of automotive lighting) and Motorpal, a manufacturer of injection pumps founded in 1946.

The most important non-industrial employers include the Jihlava Hospital and the Jihlava Psychiatric Hospital.

Transport
The D1 motorway runs through the territory of Jihlava and thus the city has excellent road connection with other regions of the Czech Republic.

Jihlava is located on the railway line on national importance Brno–České Budějovice–Plzeň and on several other regional railway lines.

Education
In 2004, the College of Polytechnics Jihlava was founded. As of 2019, it had more than 2,200 students.

Culture
Since 1997, the Jihlava International Documentary Film Festival has been held in Jihlava every year.

Sport
The city's football club is FC Vysočina Jihlava. The club plays mostly in the Czech National Football League (second tier).

The local ice hockey club, HC Dukla Jihlava, was successful between 1966–1991, however in recent decades it plays mostly in the 1st Czech Republic Hockey League (second tier).

Sights

Thanks to its building development, Gothic, Renaissance and Baroque buildings are located next to each other in Jihlava. The historic centre is formed by Masarykovo Square and its surroundings. In the past it was delimited by walls, some of which have been preserved to this day. The zwinger was modified into a park. The only surviving gate of the five is the Gate of the Holy Mother.

In the middle of the square is a plague column from 1690 and two fountains from 1797.

The landmarks of the square are the city hall and Church of Saint Ignatius of Loyola. The city hall with Gothic core has served its purpose since 1425. It was rebuilt and extended several times. In the mid-16th century, a turret with clock was added, a Gothic hall was established and the façade was decorated by a large Renaissance fresco. In 1786, the second floor was added, the fresco was overlayed by new façade, and the large Gothic hall was split in half by the wall.

Jihlava Zoo was founded in 1982. It breeds about 250 species of animals.

Ecclesiastical monuments
The early Gothic Church of Saint James the Great from the 13th century is one of the symbols of Jihlava. The Chapel of Our Lady of Sorrows was added to the church in 1702. In 1725, the church became a parish church. The higher tower is open to the public as a lookout tower. The bell in the belltower called Zuzana is the second largest bell in Moravia.

The oldest church is the Church of Saint John the Baptist. It was founded around 1200 together with the original village on the left bank of the Jihlava River. It was rebuilt several times, its current appearance is a result of Baroque reconstruction from the late 18th century.

The Friars Minor Church of the Ascension of the Virgin Mary was built after 1250. Today the originally Gothic church has a Baroque appearance. Since 1784, it has been a parish church.

The Church of Saint Ignatius of Loyola on the city square was built in the early Baroque style in 1683–1689 for the Jesuits. Next to the church is a former Jesuit dormitory built in 1699–1711.

The Dominican Church of the Exaltation of the Holy Cross was founded in 1247. The Church of the Holy Spirit was built in the Renaissance style in 1547 and rebuilt in the Mannerist style in 1661. The Evangelical Church of Saint Paul is a neo-Gothic building from 1875–1878.

The only preserved Jewish monument is the Jewish cemetery. It was founded in 1869 and contains over 1,000 tombstones, including the tombstones of the parents of Gustav Mahler.

Notable people
Gustav Mahler (1860–1911), Austrian-German composer and conductor; lived here in 1860–1875
Julius Tandler (1869–1936), physician and politician
Hans Krebs (1888–1947), Nazi SS officer executed for war crimes
František Cipro (1947–2023), football manager
Zdeněk Měřínský (1948–2016), archeologist and historian 
Ondřej Vetchý (born 1962), actor
Patrik Augusta (born 1969), ice hockey player
Bobby Holík (born 1971), ice hockey player 
Jiří Šlégr (born 1971), ice hockey player
Martin Prokop (born 1982), rally driver
Lukáš Krpálek (born 1990), judoka
David Rittich (born 1992), ice hockey player

Twin towns – sister cities

Jihlava is twinned with:
 Heidenheim an der Brenz, Germany
 Uzhhorod, Ukraine
 Zgierz, Poland

References

External links

Official website
Local and regional news

 
Populated places in Jihlava District
Cities and towns in the Czech Republic
Mining communities in the Czech Republic